Dobrica Erić (22 August 1936 – 29 March 2019) was a Serbian writer and poet.

He is the author of numerous novels, five books of romantic poetry, 23 poetry books, 5 theatre dramas and over 40 children's books. He was a "deserved creator" of the city of Belgrade. His first book of poetry was published in 1959. His works have been translated into numerous languages. He lived and worked in Belgrade and Gruža. Erić completed 4 years of elementary school, and for a period of time worked as a manual laborer. His poetry for kids and adults was inspired by the rural environment and slow pace of life.

Works (bibliography)
1959. Svet u Suncokretu 
1965. Vašar u Topoli 
1966. Stari seljački kalendar 
1968. Slavuj i sunce 
1969. Ogrlica od grlica – Kulturni Centar, Novi sad 
1973. Torta sa pet spratova 
1975. Pesma o svicima 
1976. Dolina suncokreta 
1977. Večni kratkovečnici 
1978. Slavuj i sunce – IRO. Mladost, Zagreb 
1979. Bašta sa sedam ruža 
1980. Sricanje žene 
1980. Leto u Kalipolju – IRO. Veselin Masleša, Sarajevo 
1980. Čardak između četiri jabuke 
1982. Moj drug, Milivojčićev lug 
1985. Sunčeva verenica 
1987. Tako žubori reka 
1988. Pismo kraljici cveća – Rad, Beograd 
1989. Roždestvo ratarevo 
1989. Krunisanje 
1990. Bunar za prijatelje 
1991. Puževa srma 
1991. Ekološki bukvar 
1992. San Gružanske letnje noći 
1993. Jezero Ježeva bara 
1993. U vatri bismo, ne izgorismo 
1993. Plači voljena zemljo 
1999. Razapeta zemlja 
1999. Vilina Dolina 
2002. Pusti puže rogove – IP. Rad, Beograd 
2002. Krunisanje – IP. Rad, Beograd 
2005. Deca sa zlatom lipe u kosi

References

Sources
 Slobodan Ivkov: 60 godina domaćeg stripa u Srbiji (1935–1995), Galerija "Likovni susret", Subotica, 1995. E-version: Projekat Rastko
 Borisav Čeliković, „Stripografija edicije Nikad robom“, Dani stripa '95., „Dečje novine“, Gornji Milanovac, 1995.
 Borisav Čeliković, „Četiri decenije stripa Dečjih novina“ Dani stripa '95., „Dečje novine“, Gornji Milanovac, 1995.

External links
 The works of Dobrica Erić in electronic form – eLibrary 

1936 births
2019 deaths
People from Gornji Milanovac
20th-century Serbian poets
Serbian writers
Serbian comics writers
Serbian male poets
20th-century male writers
Serbian children's writers